2013 FT28 is a trans-Neptunian object. The existence of the TNO was discovered on 16 March 2013 at Cerro Tololo Observatory, La Serena and revealed on 30 August 2016.

The orbit of  appears stable though simulations showed that it may have some resonant interaction with the known giant planets.

Its argument of perihelion is similar to that of another TNO, .

References

External links 
 
 
 

Minor planet object articles (unnumbered)
20130316